Vitrifrigo Arena, formerly known as Adriatic Arena and originally BPA Palas, is an indoor sports arena in Pesaro, Italy, home to the Victoria Libertas Pesaro professional basketball team of the Lega Basket Serie A. Its seating capacity is 10,300, rising to 13,000 for concerts, which makes it the fifth-biggest indoor arena in Italy.

Construction

Construction work began in 1993 and was completed in 1996. The venue was inaugurated with a recital by operatic tenor Luciano Pavarotti. The venue considered a futuristic construction, known to most as "the Spaceship" (l'Astronave), or as "the Ladybug" (la Coccinella) due to its external shell shape. It covers an area of 12,000 square meters and a land area of 13,000 square meters.

The multi-purpose arena is equipped with a press stand, a room for video data, a system for satellite reception, various video stations and an internal circuit control system. The venue also configures into a (much smaller) theater that is used each August for the world-renowned Rossini Opera Festival.

See also
List of indoor arenas in Italy

References

External links 

 

Sports venues in Marche
Buildings and structures in Pesaro
Indoor arenas in Italy
Basketball venues in Italy
1996 establishments in Italy
Sports venues completed in 1996